The Ararat Park Hotel Moscow is a five-star hotel in central Moscow, built in 2002 as the Ararat Park Hyatt Moscow by Murad Sargsyan, a Russian-Armenian businessman. Today, it belongs to his brother Samvel Sargsyan, who was the governor of Armenia's Vayots Dzor province from 2003 to 2007 and a member of the National Assembly of Armenia from 2007 to 2012 from the Republican Party of Armenia.

Hyatt severed their relationship with the hotel on May 12, 2022, as a result of sanctions following the 2022 Russian invasion of Ukraine.

The hotel was constructed on the location of an Armenian restaurant from the Soviet period. The modern building encompasses elements of Armenian architecture.

References

External links

Hotels in Moscow
Hotel buildings completed in 2002
Hotels established in 2002
2002 establishments in Russia